Conchas Lake Airport  is a public use airport located one nautical mile (2 km) southwest of the central business district of Conchas Dam, in San Miguel County, New Mexico, United States. It is owned by the New Mexico Department of Transportation - Aviation Division.

Facilities and aircraft 
It has one runway designated 9/27 with a 4,790 x 60 ft (1,460 x 18 m) asphalt surface. For the 12-month period ending April 30, 2005, the airport had 1,000 general aviation aircraft operations, an average of 83 per month.

See also 
Conchas Lake Seaplane Base

References

External links 

Airports in New Mexico
Transportation in San Miguel County, New Mexico
Buildings and structures in San Miguel County, New Mexico